The 2023 Mexicas de la Ciudad de México season is the Mexicas de la Ciudad de México eigth season in the Liga de Fútbol Americano Profesional (LFA) and their fourth under head coach Héctor Toxqui.

Mexicas opened the season with an upset, after losing to Galgos 6–24, in what was Galgos' first victory in its history.

Draft

Roster

Regular season

Standings

Schedule

References

2023 in American football
Mexicas